Petropavlovo is a rural locality (a selo) in Starokamyshlinsky Selsoviet, Kushnarenkovsky District, Bashkortostan, Russia. The population was 43 as of 2010. There are 4 streets.

Geography 
Petropavlovo is located 41 km southeast of Kushnarenkovo (the district's administrative centre) by road. Pervushino is the nearest rural locality.

References 

Rural localities in Kushnarenkovsky District